Gerd Roggensack (born 5 October 1941) is a German former football player and manager.

Career
As a player, he spent three seasons in the Bundesliga with 1. FC Kaiserslautern and Arminia Bielefeld, and was also part of Borussia Dortmund's 1963 German championship winning team. Roggensack was among the players involved in the 1971 Bundesliga scandal, scoring the game winner for Bielefeld in a fixed match against FC Schalke 04.

After retiring as a player, Roggensack went on to manage several clubs in the Bundesliga and 2. Bundesliga.

Personal life
Roggensack is the father-in-law of former Bundesliga footballer Bernd Gorski.

Honours
As player
 German championship: 1963
 DFB-Pokal runner-up: 1962–63

As manager
 DFB-Pokal runner-up: 1994–95

References

External links
 

1941 births
Living people
People from Güstrow
German footballers
Association football forwards
German football managers
Bundesliga players
2. Bundesliga players
Borussia Dortmund players
Arminia Bielefeld players
1. FC Kaiserslautern players
Bundesliga managers
2. Bundesliga managers
Arminia Bielefeld managers
Eintracht Braunschweig managers
SG Wattenscheid 09 managers
1. FC Kaiserslautern managers
SC Preußen Münster managers
SC Fortuna Köln managers
SpVgg Unterhaching managers
VfL Wolfsburg managers
SC Verl managers
Kickers Emden managers
Footballers from Mecklenburg-Western Pomerania
West German footballers
West German football managers